The Anglo-Saxon, English, or Baymen's settlement of Belize is traditionally thought to have been effected upon Peter Wallace's 1638 landing at the mouth of Haulover Creek. As this account lacks clear primary sources, however, scholarly discourse has tended to qualify, amend, or completely eschew said theory, giving rise to a myriad competing narratives of the English settling of Belize. Though none of the aforementioned have garnered widespread consensus, historical literature has tended to favour a circumspect account of a landing near Haulover sometime during the 1630s and 1660s, effected by logwood-seeking, haven-seeking, or shipwrecked buccaneers.

Prelude

Buccaneering 

In NovemberDecember 1544, a patax of 22 French corsairs, mates of a captain called Pedro Braques by the Spanish, were apprehended off the coast of colonial Honduras. Their arrival marked the beginning of over three centuries of piracy in the Bay of Honduras. French corsairs were (belatedly) followed into the Bay by Elizabethan Sea Dogs three decades later. The earliest of these is thought to have been either Sir Francis Drake in the Minion, or John Oxenham in the Beare, who during 23 February 1573 – 22 March 1573 cruised the Bay and watered at Guanaxa.  English buccaneering activities in the Bay intensified in the ensuing decades. Notably, during October 1577 – April 1578, an English pirate or privateer, called Francisco de Acles by the Spanish, with 60 men aboard two ships, sacked Puerto Caballos and Bacalar, possibly marking the earliest entrance of such sea dogs into Bacalar's [ie present-day Belize's] waters.  It is commonly thought that, upon the 1570s discovery of the intricate, secluded reefs, cayes, and coastline which characterised the waters of Bacalar, English buccaneers promptly opted to base their operations in this portion of the Bay, it affording them safe haven and quick access to Spanish ports.

Smuggling 

Prior to 1630, Spanish smuggling with Anglo-Dutch pirate-merchants at ports in the Bay of Honduras is thought to have 'amounted to little more than evasion of duties and taxes,' with typical cases described as 'not spectacular.' However – 
Consequently, post-1630 smuggling in the Bay is thought to have been 'sporadic but fairly frequent,' especially in indigo and logwood, 'large quantities' of which [illicitly] found their way to non-Spanish markets.

Logging 

The earliest logwood cutting near the Bay of Honduras is commonly dated to 1562, and attributed to the Spanish conquistador Marcos de Ayala Trujeque of Valladolid, Yucatan. By the 1570s, Yucatanese encomenderos were shipping to Spain some 200 tonnes of logwood per annum, principally via Campeachy. During this same decade, English pirates, privateers, or buccaneers are thought to have first recognised the commercial value of logwood, and consequently, to have increasingly sought it as prize.

It is uncertain when and where exactly English pirates or buccaneers first began surreptitiously cutting logwood, as opposed to merely seizing Spanish-cut logwood. Proposals range geographically from Campeachy to Belize, and temporally from 1599 to 1670.

English settlement 
The earliest English settlement near the Bay is thought to have been Old Providence. Anglo-Dutch buccaneers are known to have watered or camped in the island, and Cape Gracias a Dios, since at least 1616. English presence intensified shortly upon the 4 December 1630 chartering of the Old Providence Company. In 1631, Anthony Hilton's settlement in Tortuga was made a dependency of the Company. In 1633, Sussex Cammock established a trading post in Cape Gracias a Dios for Old Providence. By 29 January 1636, the Company was granted letters of reprisal against the Spanish. On 8 June 1638, the Company granted William Claiborne letters patent to settle Roatan. And shortly after 17 May 1641, Old Providence refugees are thought to have established themselves at Cape Gracias a Dios or Roatan.

Mayan revolt 

The 1638 Tipu rebellion against Bacalar, possibly (indirectly) aided by piratical raids of coastal and riverine Mayan hamlets in that district, is thought to have significantly eroded Spanish dominion and presence in Bacalar's waters.

Incident

In tradition 
Belize is traditionally held to have been among the first English settlements in the Bay of Honduras, along with Roatan. It is commonly thought to have been settled by Peter Wallace and his crew of 80 buccaneers, aboard the Swallow, in 1638. No records of this landing have been discovered, however, and it is commonly thought that none are extant, or that the story is apocryphal.

In scholarship 

The traditional story of the English settlement of Belize is the most commonly given account in scholarly literature, though historians often qualify it, given the lack of primary sources. A variety of competing accounts have been proffered since the 18th century, none of which have gained widespread scholarly favour. Despite this, most scholarly accounts seem to favour a second- or third-quarter-of-the-17th century date, with responsibility attributed to pirate's-haven-seeking, logwood-seeking, or shipwrecked buccaneers.

Notes and references

Explanatory footnotes

Short citations

Full citations

Serials

Theses

Journals

Print 
 
 
 
 
 
 
 
 
 
 
 
 
 
 
 
 
 
 
 
 
 
 
 
 
 
 
 
 
 
 
 
 
 
 
 
 
 
 
 
 
 
 
 
 
 
 
 
 
 
 
 
 
 
 
 
 
 
 
 
 
 
 
 
 
 
 
 
 
 
 
 
 
 
 
 
 
 
 
 
 
 
 

History of Belize
17th century in Belize
Piracy in the Caribbean
17th-century pirates
Caribbean pirates
English pirates